PFSweb, Inc. (Priority Fulfillment Services) is a provider of business-to-business (B2B) and direct-to-consumer (DTC) order fulfillment and customer service for eCommerce.

Services offered by PFSweb include:

Processing and shipping orders
Customer care
Managing inventory
eCommerce site development
Digital marketing services (creative, analytics, SEO/SEM, etc.)

The company was founded in 1994 in the Dallas suburb of Plano, Texas. PFSweb's corporate headquarters were relocated to Allen, Texas in March 2012 with call center operations moved to downtown Dallas, Texas.

History

1994-1998: Origin under Daisytek
PFSweb, Inc. was founded in 1994 as Priority Fulfillment Services, Inc. (PFS) by Texas-based Daisytek International Corporation, a leading wholesale distributor of computer and office automation supplies such as printer ribbons, toner cartridges, and computer disks. The new unit, founded and conceived by Daisytek CEO Mark C. Layton, was initially created to perform order-processing, fulfillment, and telemarketing services for other companies, due to a growing demand for outsourcing in this area. Soon after its formation under Daisytek, PFSweb was chosen to perform telemarketing and distribution services for IBM product lines throughout North America.

PFSweb soon began to take on additional clients, and Daisytek doubled the size of its own "superhub" warehouse/shipping center in Memphis, Tennessee in part because of the unit's success.

1999-2001: PFSweb completes its IPO and expands into Europe
In January 1999, the company formed a European division, PFSweb Europe, with 10 employees working at a call and fulfillment center in Maastricht, Netherlands, and also launched a new division that offered order fulfillment services to internet-based retailers. It was targeted toward both web-based and brick-and-mortar firms who were adding web ordering capabilities to their businesses and needed to get systems and staff in place quickly.

In early December 1999, one-fifth of the company, now bearing the name PFSweb Inc., highlighted by its eCommerce capabilities, was sold in an initial public offering (IPO). Mark Layton, the 40-year-old CEO of Daisytek, who had recently published a book called “.coms or .bombs ... Strategies for Profit in e-Business”, took the titles of president, CEO, and chairman of PFSweb, while remaining the board chairman of Daisytek. In June 2000, Daisytek completed a tax free distribution of its remaining share ownership of PFSweb to its shareholders and as part of the design of this transaction, Layton resigned as chairman and CEO of Daisytek in order to focus full attention on the leadership of PFSweb.

In late July 2000, PFSweb introduced the Entente Suite of software, which offered full eCommerce support from web site interface to back-office accounting functions, customizable to meet each customer's needs. PFSweb also added managed hosting and web site development services to its offerings. To accomplish the former, the firm established a secure data center.

2002-2004: Online expansion and company layoffs
In February 2002, PFSweb began offering customized manufacturing and supplier inventory services to further support its clients. In June, PFSweb signed a five-year contract with the Smithsonian Institution's Business Ventures unit to provide fulfillment services for catalog and web orders. An alliance was also formed with eBay that would allow PFSweb's clients to distribute their products via that firm's online auction site. PFSweb was striving to cut costs after losing key clients during the .com bubble burst, which ultimately forced them to lay off 60 employees, paring its total staff to about 550.

In June 2004, PFSweb, Texas, and Raytheon Aircraft Company jointly announced that PFSweb would perform fulfillment services at the Raytheon Aircraft Parts Inventory & Distribution (RAPID) facility.

In August 2004, the company signed a lease on a  warehouse/shipping center in Southaven, Mississippi, which was located near its Memphis superhub site. The firm had been in a dispute with Memphis officials since 2003, when former parent company Daisytek had gone bankrupt and tax breaks previously granted for the Memphis site had ended. When an appeal to re-acquire the tax breaks was denied, the firm sought a new location outside of Memphis.

2005-2007: Adding eCOST.com and Asia expansion
In June 2005, PFSweb launched a new corporate website to reflect the company's position as a leading business process outsourcing (BPO) provider.

In November 2005, PFSweb and eCOST.com announced that they had entered into a non-binding letter of intent (LOI) signifying the merger of PFSweb and eCOST.com. Under the terms of the merge, PFSweb issued eCOST.com shareholders one PFSweb common share for each outstanding share of eCOST.com in a tax-free, share-for-share transaction. As a result, eCOST.com became a wholly owned subsidiary of PFSweb. The merger was officially completed in February 2006.

In 2006, PFSweb named Michael Willoughby as the President of the company and acquired several notable clients, including LEGO, Roots Canada Ltd, and Katun Canada.

PFSweb, Inc. announced in April 2007 that it would be expanding customer care services operations with a new  customer call center in the Philippines. The new facility, located in downtown Manila, initially housed the customer service department for eCOST.com, but on a case-by-case basis the services of this location were also offered to PFSweb clients.

2008-2010: Partnerships and new clients
In early 2008, PFSweb formed a partnership with Demandware to assist in targeting the e-commerce technology market - the purpose was to combine Demandware's e-commerce platform with PFSweb's fulfillment and customer care services. PFSweb integrated the technology with its existing services, allowing PFSweb to enter into the marketplace of End-to-End (E2E) suppliers with PFSweb's End2End eCommerce® solution.

PFSweb announced in April 2009 a five-year agreement had been reached with Army & Air Force Exchange Service (AAFES) to provide a comprehensive global fulfillment solution that supports the All Services Exchange Catalog and Online Store.

On January 15, 2010, it was announced that PFSweb and Procter and Gamble (P&G) had joined to launch an online store. Named the “eStore”, this online shopping site is owned and operated by PFSweb and will exclusively feature P&G products for sale to consumers within the United States. The eStore was planned to launch in the spring of 2010, pending a pilot of the site with 5,000 consumers.

On April 7, 2010, Carter's, Inc. selected PFSweb to operate their innovative multi-brand web store along with their high-touch customer care services, as well as fully branded order fulfillment and comprehensive financial transaction management for the Carter's and OshKosh B'Gosh brands.

2011-2013: Sale of eCOST.com and the launch of an omni-channel solution
On February 22, 2011, it was announced that PFSweb completed the sale of certain assets of eCOST.com to a new subsidiary of PC Mall, Inc. for $2.3 million. In addition, PC Mall has contracted with PFSweb to provide a variety of eCommerce services, including IT and customer care to support PC Mall's newly acquired eCOST.com operations on a temporary basis. PFSweb announced on March 22, 2011, its partnership with luxury brand kate spade New York using its End2End eCommerce offering. This eCommerce effort was unique for PFSweb in that the kate spade New York website not only features  an eCommerce storefront, but also a collaborative "play" section focused on content instead of products. PFSweb also announced on September 15, 2011, its global relationship with the Clarins Group and on January 4, 2012, an agreement with L'Oréal USA to launch and manage eCommerce sites for a portfolio of brands including Kiehl's, Lancôme, Yves Saint Laurent Beauté, and Giorgio Armani Beauty. In March 2012, Gerber Childrenswear announced their updated eCommerce website using PFSweb's End2End eCommerce solution and in April 2012, PFSweb announced an agreement with Elizabeth Arden.

PFSweb announced more clients in 2012 including Amer Sports Group and its Suunto brand, W. L. Gore and Associates and its BIKE WEAR and RUNNING WEAR brands, and Pandora A/S. The company also received another supplier of the year award from Riverbed and launched a new solution through a partnership with Shopatron to create an omni-channel commerce solution. At the end of 2012 it was announced PFSweb was selected to launch and support eCommerce solutions for Kraft Foods brands Gevalia and Tassimo.

In February 2013, PFSweb announced a relationship with BCBGMAXAZRIAGROUP and also launched a branded eCommerce site for spirits and alcoholic beverage producer Diageo. The following month, PFSweb announced a leadership change as Mike Willoughby replaced Mark Layton as CEO of the company. One of Willoughby's first actions as CEO was the forming of a relationship with Japanese company transcosmos, who also made a $14.7 million investment in PFSweb. New clients added in 2013 included TJX Companies, L'Oréal brand Clarisonic, the United States Mint, and Delsey Luggage. PFSweb announced in 2014 it would provide eCommerce solutions for the Japanese mattress topper brand airweave by leveraging its relationship with transcosmos. Other client additions included L'Oreal brand Urban Decay, and Canada eCommerce support for the brand Canada Goose.

2014-Present: Company acquisitions and international growth
PFSweb acquired two companies in September 2014 - REV Solutions (eCommerce development and integration) and LiveAreaLabs (creative services, user experience, and digital strategy). The company continued its international growth into 2015 by launching offices in Germany and the U.K. as well as expanding operations in Bangalore, India (a result of the Manila office closing). PFSweb completed the acquisitions of MODA Superbe Limited (MODA), a European eCommerce system integrator and consultancy in June and eCommerce systems integrator CrossView in August 2015. PFSweb completed the acquisition of Conexus Limited, a U.K.-based eCommerce system integrator in June 2015.

2015-2016: PFSweb rebrands to PFS, launches Consulting practice
PFSweb launched their official Consulting practice in November 2015, led by Douglas Hollinger, PhD.

References

External links

 PFSweb Official Website

Outsourcing companies
Providers of services to on-line companies
Online companies of the United States
Companies based in Allen, Texas